Ndadaye Day is a public holiday in Burundi celebrated on October 21. It remembers the assassination of Melchior Ndadaye.

External links
 http://everydaysaholiday.org/ndadaye-burundi/

Burundian culture